The 1824 United States presidential election in Delaware took place between October 26 and December 2, 1824, as part of the 1824 United States presidential election. Voters chose three representatives, or electors to the Electoral College, who voted for President and Vice President.

During this election, the Democratic-Republican Party was the only major national party, and four different candidates from this party sought the Presidency. Delaware cast two electoral votes for William H. Crawford and one for John Quincy Adams.

Results

See also
 United States presidential elections in Delaware

References

Delaware
1824
1824 Delaware elections